The Sri Lankan sambar or Indian sambar (Rusa unicolor unicolor) - it is also spelt "sambhur" or "sambur" - ගෝනා (gōṇā) in Sinhala, is a subspecies of the sambar that lives in India and Sri Lanka. This subspecies is one of the largest sambar subspecies, with the largest antlers both in size and in body proportions. Large males weight up to 270–280 kg. Sambar live in both lowland dry forests and mountain forests. Large herds of sambar roam the Horton Plains National Park, where it is the most common large mammal.

British explorers and planters referred to it, erroneously, as an elk, leading to place names such as Elk Plain.

References

External links 

Mammals of Sri Lanka
Mammals of India
Rusa (genus)
Subspecies